The Rascal 14 is an American sailing dinghy that was designed by Ray Greene and first built in 1961.

The Rascal 14 design was developed into the slightly modified Rascal II.

Production
The design was built by Ray Greene & Company in the United States. The company built 3,000 examples of the design starting in 1961, but production had ended by the time the company went out of business in 1975.

Design
The Rascal 14 is a recreational sailboat, built predominantly of fiberglass, with teak wood trim. It has a fractional sloop rig with black-colored, hard-coated aluminum spars and a tabernacle-mounted mast. The hull has a spooned plumb stem, a vertical transom, a transom-hung rudder controlled by a tiller and a retractable centerboard mounted in an enclosed trunk. It displaces  and can be fitted with a  spinnaker.

For sailing the design is equipped with a jib window and adjustable jib tracks. Foam flotation provides positive buoyancy and the boat has two storage lockers, one forward and one aft.

The design has a Portsmouth Yardstick racing average handicap of 108.9 and is normally raced with a crew of two sailors.

Operational history
Sail magazine named the Rascal a "breakthrough boat", due to its intended role for beginners and first-time boat buyers.

See also
List of sailing boat types

References

External links
Photo of a Rascal 14

Dinghies
1960s sailboat type designs
Sailboat type designs by Ray Greene
Sailboat types built by Ray Greene & Company